Shinga (Shanga) is a village in the Ngarwe communal lands of Mudzi District, Mashonaland East Province, Zimbabwe.  The population is about 100 and consists mainly of subsistence farmers. The community has a school and a clinic. It gives its name to a ward of the Mudzi West constituency.

Notes

Populated places in Mashonaland East Province